The 2022 World Junior-B Curling Championships were held from December 8 to 19 at the Kisakallio Sports Institute in Lohja, Finland. The top three men's and women's teams qualified for the 2023 World Junior Curling Championships.

Men

Teams

The teams are listed as follows:

Round-robin standings
Final round-robin standings

Round-robin results

All draw times are listed in Eastern European Summer Time (UTC+03:00).

Draw 1
Thursday, December 8, 8:00

Draw 2
Thursday, December 8, 12:00

Draw 3
Thursday, December 8, 16:00

Draw 4
Thursday, December 8, 20:00

Draw 5
Friday, December 9, 8:00

Draw 6
Friday, December 9, 12:00

Draw 7
Friday, December 9, 16:00

Draw 8
Friday, December 9, 20:00

Draw 9
Saturday, December 10, 8:00

Draw 10
Saturday, December 10, 12:00

Draw 11
Saturday, December 10, 16:00

Draw 12
Saturday, December 10, 20:00

Draw 13
Sunday, December 11, 9:00

Draw 14
Sunday, December 11, 14:00

Draw 15
Sunday, December 11, 19:00

Playoffs

Quarterfinals
Monday, December 12, 13:00

Semifinals
Monday, December 12, 18:00

Bronze medal game
Tuesday, December 13, 10:00

Gold medal game
Tuesday, December 13, 10:00

Final standings

Women

Teams

The teams are listed as follows:

Round-robin standings
Final round-robin standings

Round-robin results

All draw times are listed in Eastern European Summer Time (UTC+03:00).

Draw 1
Thursday, December 15, 9:00

Draw 2
Thursday, December 15, 14:00

Draw 3
Thursday, December 15, 19:00

Draw 4
Friday, December 16, 9:00

Draw 5
Friday, December 16, 14:00

Draw 6
Friday, December 16, 19:00

Draw 7
Saturday, December 17, 9:00

Draw 8
Saturday, December 17, 14:00

Draw 9
Saturday, December 17, 19:00

Draw 10
Sunday, December 18, 9:00

Playoffs

Quarterfinals
Sunday, December 18, 17:00

Semifinals
Monday, December 19, 9:00

Bronze medal game
Monday, December 19, 14:00

Gold medal game
Monday, December 19, 14:00

Final standings

References

External links

World Junior-B Curling Championships
World Junior-B Curling Championships
International curling competitions hosted by Finland
Sports competitions in Lohja
World Junior-B Curling Championships
World Junior-B Curling Championships
World Junior Curling B